Saqr Mamdouh Al-Enezi (born 3 October 1998) is a Saudi Arabian professional footballer who plays as a left back for Pro League side Al-Batin.

Career statistics

Club

References

External links
 
 

1998 births
Living people
Saudi Arabian footballers
Association football fullbacks
Al Batin FC players
Saudi Professional League players